Today Daily News was a Chinese language newspaper in Canada, launched on November 1, 2005. It was published by Today Daily News International in Scarborough.

It was called the Canada Eastern Edition (加東版 Pinyin: jiā dōng bǎn) even though it was the only edition published at the moment.

The paper was published 7 days a week in traditional Chinese in the broadsheet format. News coverage includes headline news, news at the metro and national levels, news from Greater China, Chinese community news, international news, entertainment, financial news, sports, and supplements.

The paper did not own its own printing press; printing is being contracted out to a printer.

Compared with the other three main Chinese newspapers, the reporting style of Today Daily News was relatively sensationalist. The reporting style seems to be approximately comparable to the Toronto Sun, but not as sensationalist as the likes of Apple Daily or the Hong Kong Sun.

In 2008, Toronto Sun acquired a 50% stake in the paper.

The online version

Today Daily News was also published online on the World Wide Web but the old domain address redirected to Today Commercial News  which opened to a landing page of several Chinese publications, none of them called Today Daily News.

The online version contained an exact copy of the day's newspaper; back issues were online for 7 days. Access was free of charge.

Supplements (magazines)

Two weekly magazine were distributed free of charge as supplements:
Saturday—Today BQ Magazine (現代北京青年週刊) was in tabloid size; it was a lifestyle-and-entertainment magazine from Beijing, China which is published in simplified Chinese.
It had the Home Guide Magazine contents inside, with information on Greater Toronto's new, resale and rental homes. Its editorial contents of home improvement and renovation originated from the Sun Media.
Today BQ served primarily the Mandarin-speaking Chinese immigrants from Mainland China.
Sunday-701 was the most popular entertainment magazine, with hot gossips on celebrities and stars, fashion and fad from Hong Kong's Oriental Sunday(東方新地). It was printed in art glossy paper.
701 served primarily the Cantonese-speaking Chinese immigrants from Hong Kong.

Launch
Today Daily News and its website were launched in November 2005. The domain has since  expired and currently appears to be parked and monetized with advertising by the domain holder, Network Solutions LLC.

Rivals
 The Epoch Times (Chinese)
 Ming Pao Daily News
 Sing Tao Daily
 World Journal

See also
List of newspapers in Canada

External links
 Pinyin translated with CozyChinese.COM

References

Chinese-Canadian culture in Toronto
Chinese-language newspapers published in Canada
Newspapers published in Toronto
Chinese-language newspapers (Traditional Chinese)
Publications established in 2005
Daily newspapers published in Ontario
2005 establishments in Ontario
Defunct newspapers published in Ontario